is a Japanese novel written by Rieko Yoshihara. Originally serialized in the  magazine Shōsetsu June between December 1986 and October 1987, the story was collected into a hardbound novel that was released in Japan in 1990, and eventually expanded on and released in 6 paperback volumes.  

This futuristic tale is set in a world ruled by a super computer Jupiter, where its cyborg creations, the Elites, who are assigned various social roles based on their hair color, rule over the human populace. Iason Mink, a high-class "Blondy" elite from the capital Tanagura, runs into Riki, a "Mongrel" from the slums, and makes him his "Pet". This decision was seen as taboo in Tanagura where Pets are a status symbol and are expected to be well-bred, and was also unacceptable to Riki who had his freedom taken away from him. As Riki learns of the dangers Iason faces by keeping him, he finds himself developing feelings for his master. While focusing on the relationship between Iason and Riki, Ai no Kusabi also explores issues of caste systems and social exclusion, as well as the implications of Artificial Intelligence ruling over a human society. 

The novel was partially adapted into a two-episode original video animation (OVA) by Anime International Company (AIC), with the first episode released in August 1992 and the second in May 1994. In November 1993, an audio drama entitled Dark Erogenous  was released focusing on a time period left unexplored in the original novels. A new twelve-episode OVA adaptation, also from AIC, was scheduled to begin releasing in Japan in the spring of 2010, but was cancelled for financial reasons. The project was picked up again and was released on January 18, 2012. However, the series was once again discontinued after four episodes.

The novel is licensed for an English language release in North America by Digital Manga Publishing, which published the novel over an eight-volume series.

Plot

Setting
Ai no Kusabi takes place on the world of Amoi, which is ruled by a computer named Jupiter. After initially being a product of unrestricted scientific research, Jupiter gained self awareness, and overthrew its human creators. It banished humans from Amoi's central city, Tanagura, and created its own, improved, version of humanity - the Elites. Elites are cyborgs, their bodies entirely artificial, save for their enhanced, organic brains.

The human population was relegated to second class citizens who now lived in Midas, Tanagura's satellite city. Jupiter imposed strict social norms both on the elites and on the humans: Noram, the class system which, based on their hair colour, ranked the elites and assigned them specific social roles, and Zein which controlled and determined every facet of human life in Midas (and was not based on hair colour).

Eventually, tired of their lack of freedom, some humans rebelled against Jupiter in what was known as the Ceres Independence Rebellion. Jupiter graciously allowed them this independence without bloodshed, but what seemed to be a victory soon proved to be pyrrhic. Ceres was cut off from the rest of Midas and no longer acknowledged by Tanagura, and was left to fend for itself - a task it failed to do. Eventually, the area descended into chaos and became the slums. Its denizens, now derided as slum mongrels, were viewed as the lowest class, abhorred by the rest of Midas. Ceres was no longer bound by Zein and unlike Midas, practiced natural reproduction, however for reasons unknown to them, the birthrate of boys was much greater to that of girls, which resulted in the skewed ratio where males outnumbered females 9 to 1.

The society of the elites, who enjoyed every luxury possible, put great value on social class. Pets, who were genetically engineered humans bred in various "production centers" in Midas, were kept by the elite for entertainment and served as status symbols. It was expected that the pedigree and rank of the pet would be appropriate to that of its elite owner, with Academy produced pure bred pets reserved for the highest ranks - the 13 Blondies. As cyborgs with an artificial body, elites themselves had no interest in sex, however the pets were used for voyeuristic entertainment and were made to copulate with each other at so called "mating parties", as the elites observed. They were not viewed as having intrinsic value and were at complete mercy of their owners, to be treated as nothing more than pretty decorations to be discarded once they served their purpose.

Tending to both pets and the elites were "Furniture", castrated, adolescent boys viewed as nothing more than objects. They were "installed" in each elite's domicile and expected to take care of the home as well as their master's and pet's every need.

Locations

Amoi
Amoi is the twelfth planet in the Garan star system and was once a small, barren planet. Amoi was first settled by a group of scientists who sought to make a metropolis society unconstrained by political pressures and religious taboos. They created Tanagura as their central city and made the supercomputer named "Jupiter." Jupiter eventually attained a consciousness of its own and seized power over Tanagura, forcing humans into its satellite city, Midas. Jupiter's vision for Amoi was to continue to be an independent planet free from man-made taboos, especially those of sexual nature. After some initial outcries from other worlds about its human rights violations, eventually the planet established itself as a premium tourist resort, catering to every desire imaginable, especially famous for its breeding and use of Pets.

Midas 
Midas, which was divided into 9 areas, each with its distinct purpose, was the home of Amoi's humans and the main tourist hub. Areas 1 (Lhassa) and 2 (Flare) were its main attractions where regardless of ones race, gender, sexuality or religion, tourists could spend their time and money visiting casinos, brothels, malls and clubs. Being the most sexually liberal place in the known universe, naturally most tourists were attracted by the unconstrained sexual services offered there.

Ceres 
Formerly a part of Midas, Area 9, Ceres, is an autonomous region, removed from all official maps of the city and no longer recognised by Tanagura. Its citizens were born in the Guardian foster center, where they were raised until they were 13, at which point they would be declared adults and discharged, left to fend for themselves. The skewed gender ratio made fertile females invaluable, and they were given preferential treatment, offered to stay in Guardian to reproduce or take care of the children. As a result, the population of Ceres, outside of Guardian, consisted almost entirely of disenfranchised men. This gave birth to a very specific environment and culture, one where same sex relations are the norm and there were no real families. Instead, the "mongrels" formed groups, or even gangs, that served as social units meant for protection and company, and romantically, couples could "pair up" and be each other's "pairing partners" which, although not officialised, was akin to marriage.

Tanagura
Tanagura is the metallic city under the direct and complete control of Jupiter. Inhabited almost entirely by elites and androids, the only warm-blooded creatures could be found in Eos Tower, the residential area for elites. This is where they had their homes, and as a result where pets and furniture lived. Jupiter itself resides in its Jupiter Tower, and most business and official banquets take place in Parthea.

Terminology

Elites 
Created by Jupiter to be a new kind of humanity that is not restricted by flesh. Their bodies are entirely artificial, made to be well-proportioned and beautiful. It is indicated that the quality and functionality of their bodies differs between ranks. The only organic part are their brains, enhanced to be unnaturally intelligent and quick and processing information. While their engineered bodies can feel some sensation, they are in fact not capable of feeling true pleasure or pain.

Their society is strictly segregated by rank according to the Noram class system, and the differences are absolute and unassailable. Not much is known about the ranks other than the highest one, Blondy, except that they clearly don't mingle with the lower class elites.

The elite classes not only determine their rank, but also their function:

Blondy – The "elites of the elite", the highest rank of elites with the authority to communicate directly with Jupiter. They have golden hair and occupy the most important positions within the Tanagura society.
Platina – Silver-haired elites that hold various leadership and executive positions.
Ruby, Jade, and Sapphire – Subdivided by their individual specialties, they are advisers to the other elites.
Onyx – The "face" of Tanagura, the black-haired elites are the lowest of the caste with external responsibilities. They take administrator positions and are in charge of government businesses, such as being ambassadors and consuls.

Pets 
Pets are produced in licensed breeding facilities, also known as Production Centers, and are regulated by a strict Pet Law. They are genetically identical to humans, but are artificially created and viewed as nothing more or less than expensive merchandise. As such, they are usually sold at dedicated Pet Auctions and purchased by the rich and powerful across the known universe. The most reputable breeding facility is the Academy Science Center, whose pets are considered to be the highest quality. Academy also produces the famed pure-blood pets, reserved exclusively for Blondies.

They comprise the bulk of entertainment among the elites of Tanagura and serve as status symbols used exclusively for voyeuristic purposes. Owning a pet in itself denotes an incredibly high status among the denizens of Amoi, but the quality of a pet also sets apart their owners, sometimes drastically so.

Pets are usually acquired very young and, depending on the whim of their owner, usually disposed of in their late teens.

Furniture 
Adolescent boys who are castrated and used by the elites to take care of their everyday needs are known as furniture. A nice appearance and high intelligence are the basis upon which the boys are picked at the age of 13, after which they are trained for several months and given to their new elite master. They take care of the home and, most importantly, of the pet. Since pets are trained for a very specific purpose and not expected to know how to take care of themselves, it is the furniture's duty to make sure the pet eats, is dressed, behaves and has a comfortable life.

Black Market 
The Black Market is the illicit trade business that thrives on Amoi due to the nature of the planet's culture. The Syndicate that runs it is ruled by the Blondy Iason Mink, and his right-hand man, Katze. The Market deals with selling and shipping contraband across the known universe as well as organising specialised auctions, fencing stolen goods and trading military technology.

Characters

Main

The primary protagonist of the series. Riki is a mongrel from Ceres and the former leader of his gang, Bison. Considered the "charisma of the slums", Riki was proud, rebellious, fierce, and defiant, known throughout the slums for his fiery nature and his striking appearance. because of his unusual black hair and eyes, he was compared to Vajra, a mythical black beast. Before becoming Iason's pet, Riki's pairing partner was Guy, the second-in-command of Bison, but their relationship ended once Iason forced Riki to be his pet and didn't recover even when Riki returned to the slums. Before being taken to Eos, he worked under Katze as a black market courier. Despite being the youngest in their ranks, at only 16, he proved himself to be capable, adaptable and clever, earning him the name "Riki the Dark".
But as a pet, Riki was anything but compliant. Throughout the story, Riki is torn between his pride and the feelings he has for Iason that he is unwilling to acknowledge.

 

Iason is one of the central characters of Ai no Kusabi. He is a Blondy who functions as the head of the Market Intelligence Department and rules the Syndicate behind the black market. He has an elegant and calm demeanor that hides a passionate, ruthless, manipulative, and unforgiving nature. He is in love with his pet Riki, a mongrel from the slums, which casts a dark shadow over his seeming perfection. At first, Iason is interested in what it would be like to have a gang leader from the slums as a pet, instead of one of those non-thinking pets bred by the Academy, but slowly he begins to develop feelings for Riki to the point of obsession.

 

Riki's former pairing partner and his second-in-command in Bison. Guy and Riki had been together since their Guardian days and have been inseparable since. Calm, reasonable and collected, he was the counterweight to Riki's fiery impulsiveness. When Riki came back after his mysterious 3 year disappearance, Guy was reluctant to pry, respecting his privacy and giving him space, even if it meant that they were no longer partners. But after he caught a glimpse of what was really going on in Riki's life, and realising that Riki had been an unwilling slave to a Blondy for those years, he attempts to do whatever he can in order to retrieve Riki from Iason.

 

Iason's right-hand man in the black market. Unbeknownst to most, Katze used to be Iason's furniture. A computer genius, he almost uncovered what he calls the "Secrets of Tanagura" during time as furniture, but was caught in the act by Iason, who punished him by slashing his left cheek, which earned him his trademark scar. Rather than dispose of him, Iason recognised the exceptional intelligence and capability of the boy, and put him to work on the black market.
Katze finds himself a reluctant bystander in the saga between Riki and Iason, and due to his role in both their lives, he has a front row seat to the unraveling of their lives and is frustrated at his inability to do anything. Despite his cool, seemingly uncaring nature, he cares for both Iason and Riki and tries his best to look after both of them.

 

A Blondie who is the chief scientist of Tanagura, and Iason Mink's best friend. He serves as the voice of reason, concern and societal pressure as Iason's infatuation with Riki becomes more obvious. 
Raoul is one of, if not the most prominent scientist in the known universe and because of his disregard for bioethics, as well as his capability to use his medical advances to cure entire worlds on a whim, is known as "the God killer". He is at the forefront of bioengineering and pet research and breeding.

 

The youngest and only new member of Bison after their inception, Kirie is 3 years younger than the other members and joins them a year after Riki's disappearance. He stands out due to his good looks and heterochromia as well as his unconstrained ambition. Driven and sly, Kirie will stop at nothing to get himself out of the slums and make something of himself. Because of their similar strong personalities yet vastly different moral compasses, Riki and Kirie butt heads constantly upon Riki's return, to the point where Riki develops a strong dislike for the newcomer. After being ousted from Bison, undeterred, Kirie pursues other avenues including making a backstabbing deal with Iason and pursuing a relationship with Manon Sol Kuger, Guardian's heir. Eventually, Kirie bites off more than he can chew which spells his downfall.

Minor characters
 

Iason's furniture when Riki first comes to Eos, Daryl is capable, intelligent and meticulous. Despite this, the shock of having to take care of an untrained, unwilling mongrel pet was hard for him to handle. Although he did his best, Daryl had a hard time, especially at witnessing the volatile relationship between Iason and Riki. Eventually, in what is knowns as the Daryl Incident, for his own reasons, Daryl hacks the Eos security system and releases Riki. This acts as a catalyst in Riki and Iason's relationship as Iason, shocked and confused at his, usually obedient, furniture's actions, brings him in for questioning. Daryl gives him his honest and heartfelt insight in the situation and most of all, in how much it hurts him to see Riki suffer. Although Iason punishes him, it does make him realise that something needs to change, which leads to him releasing Riki into the slums for his "one year breather".

Also known as Lambda 3000, is the artificial intelligence that rules Amoï. Created by the scientists that first colonised the planet, Jupiter was created to be the pinnacle of human achievement. Upon gaining self-consciousness, Jupiter overthrew its creators and focused its intelligence on creating a new, improved version of humanity. The result were the Elites, human-like androids whose only organic parts were their nano-enhanced brains. In the 1990s OVAs, it is depicted as a silver-colored statue in hologram form. In the remake OVAs, it takes the appearance of a large violet hologram.

 

A Blondie and is responsible with supervising the parties, security details, and helps appease any trouble that might arise in Eos Tower. He is known as an "elegant noble" among the Blondies, and takes great pride in his position as supervisor over Eos Tower. Like all Blondies, he has a fascination over Riki, although Orphe also despises him because he was the first person to get past his security details in Eos Tower (due to Iason's former Furniture Daryl's assistance). In the remake OVAs, he is voiced by. In the English dub, he is voiced by

 

A Blondie and the chief of Midas with a wicked sense of humor. Like all Blondies, he has a fascination over Riki and finds the scandals Riki causes as a source of entertainment, but he also disapproves of his actions and Iason's infatuation for him.

A Blondie and is charge of overseeing Tanagura but holds little power over Eos Tower. Like all Blondies, he has a fascination over Riki, but to a lesser extent because Riki and his pet often fight with each other. He openly voices his disapproval over Riki to Iason and enjoys criticizing Iason about Riki's scandals.

 

Raoul Am's female Pet of the highest breeding and Riki's only friend in Eos. Unlike most pets, she was kind to Riki and fell in love with him, which led to them having forbidden intercourse. Although Riki did cared for her, he used her as a way to test Iason's feelings and make him jealous and ruin his public image. When the affair went public, Iason punished Riki and forced him to tell Mimea the motive behind his actions over a holoscreen. However, Mimea insisted that it was made just to push her and Riki apart, and she told Riki that she will be paired to another pet named Jena, whom she described as a sex freak with nothing but his looks and that thinking of carrying his children pained her. As Riki was silent because his pet ring was fully activated at that time and he had a hard time speaking and breathing, this led Mimea to think that he had abandoned her and calling him a coward. When Riki returned to Eos Tower after three years, Raoul replaced Mimea with a new pet, and Riki never heard what happened to her.

A friend and member of Riki's former gang Bison from Ceres. Although typically easy-going, Luke is daring and cares deeply about his friends. While Luke is known to prefers virgins as pairing partners, Luke has an infatuation towards Riki and is the only member in Bison to shows his desire openly, but backs off once Riki makes it clear he's uninterested.

 

A friend and member of Riki's former gang Bison from Ceres. Much like Luke, Norris is energetic and easy-going, though has shown a thoughtful side at times. Although Norris once had a secret infatuation towards Riki, Norris found a serious and happy relationship with Maxi, a mechanic ten years older than him. In the 1990s OVAs, he was voiced by. In the remake OVAs, he voiced by.

A friend and member of Riki's former gang Bison from Ceres. Compare to the other members of Bison, Sid is more quiet and stoic, and is a good fighter. Like Luke and Norris, Sid has an infatuation towards Riki, but he kept his desires a secret out of respect for Guy. During Riki's three-year "disappearance" from Ceres, Sid was the one who recruited Kirie into Bison as the teenager's proud rebelliousness reminded him of Riki.

 

The young castrated boy that serves as Iason's Furniture and Riki's caretaker, replacing Daryl after his death. Much like Daryl, Cal is dutiful and quiet, but wasn't overly attentive to Riki as Daryl was. As Riki met Cal after he learns that all Furniture are secretly from Ceres, Riki treats Cal with more respect than he did with Daryl, and the two established a more professional relationship, as Riki wishes not to get attached to Cal.

Media

Novel
Written by Rieko Yoshihara, the individual chapters of Ai no Kusabi were serialized in the  magazine Shōsetsu June between December 1986 and October 1987. The chapters were collected and published as a single hardbound novel in 1990. The series was later released in a revised and greatly expanded paperback edition from Seibidō Shuppan under their Crystal imprint; however, the Crystal edition is incomplete, covering only six of eight books. The series was then acquired by Tokuma Shoten and a complete edition was published in six volumes under their Chara imprint; the first four are semi-omnibus (volumes 1–4 correspond to Crystal volumes 1–6) and the final two are the previously unreleased material. The novel was licensed for an English language release in North America by Juné, the  imprint of Digital Manga Publishing (DMP). The English edition from Juné was originally based on the Crystal edition, and will have eight volumes (corresponding to Crystal 1–6 plus Chara 5 and 6). The first volume was released on November 20, 2007 and the sixth on July 28, 2009. After a long hiatus, caused in part by re-negotiation required by the change in Japanese publisher, the remaining two volumes, volume 7 and volume 8, were released on August 29, 2012, and on April 24, 2013, respectively. In June 2009, DMP made the first volume of Ai no Kusabi, Stranger, available as an Amazon Kindle e-book.

CDs
The first spin-off from the novels was an audiobook released on May 31, 1989.

Five soundtracks were released:
間の楔 オリジナル・サウンド・トラック (Ai no Kusabi Original Soundtrack) (10 October 1992)
間の楔 SENSE OF CRISIS (10 December 1993)
間の楔 AMBIVALENCE (25 March 1994)
間の楔 SYMPATHY (10 July 1994)
間の楔 Sound Selection of "AI NO KUSABI" 祈り-ORACION- (25 January 1995)

The first drama CD was released in November 1993 under the name "間の楔 DARK-EROGENOUS". Three more drama CDs were later released by a different company throughout 2007 and 2008.
間の楔I 〜DESTINY〜 (25 May 2007)
間の楔II 〜NIGHTMARE〜 (25 April 2008)
間の楔III 〜RESONANCE〜 (25 October 2008)

Original video animations
Anime International Company created a two-episode original video animation (OVA) adaptation for the series. The first episode was released in August 1992, and the second in May 1994. Directed by Akira Nishimori and Katsuhito Akiyama, the episodes were based on a screenplay written by Naoko Hasegawa. They featured character designs by Naoyuki Onda and music composed by Toshio Yabuki. The plot slightly differed from the novels' storyline, but kept the main story points intact.

Remake
A second twelve-episode anime OVA adaptation, also from AIC, was scheduled to begin releasing in Japan in Fall 2010. Due to financial issues, production was cancelled for a period of time, and it was re-scheduled for January 18, 2012, instead. Akiyama directed again and Onda provided the character designs. The screenplay was written by Yoshihara herself. The Blu-ray release of the OVA included a new short story by Yoshihara.

Anime licensor Media Blasters announced they licensed the remake's first four OVAs for a North American release in December 2012. However, on November 28, 2012, they notified retailers that it would be delayed until April 23, 2013. On October 11, 2017, Media Blasters announced they would re-release Ai no Kusabi on Blu-ray with an English dub. The Blu-ray was released on December 19, 2017. On September 20, 2018, Toku added Ai no Kusabi to its streaming service, allowing viewers to watch the OVAs in Japanese with English subtitles.

After the fourth episode premiered in 2012, the remake was discontinued for unknown reasons.

Reception

Mania's Danielle Van Gorder felt the prose of the first novel was "florid", and criticized the finishing point of the second novel as anticlimactic. She found the characterization of Iason in the third novel to be realistic and compelling, and felt the theme of the fourth novel was power. Jonathan Clements compared Yoshihara's writing style to "Ranpo Edogawa's sexually charged mysteries" and felt Ai no Kusabi shared themes with Shōzō Numa's science fiction.

Patrick Drazen has described the Ai no Kusabi OVA as a "magnum opus" of the  genre, and the setting as dystopian, similar to Fritz Lang's Metropolis. Jonathan Clements and Helen McCarthy liken the society of Ai no Kusabi to that of Ancient Greece, where power was restricted to a class and women do not figure significantly. They consider it ironic that Jupiter is a feminine computer, and describe her as being like Ghost in the Shell'''s Motoko Kusanagi – Jupiter is "a man-made idea of the female in a world run by male elites". Anime News Network's Maral Agnerian praised its interesting, well-developed plot and "fleshed out and complex" work. She also praises it for being one of the few series from its time to contain "actual gay sex in it instead of the usual angsty moping and shoujo-esque sparkly kisses", while noting that the scenes are primarily in the second episode. Anime News Network's Justin Sevakis highlighted the OVA as a "Buried Treasure", calling it "one of the best yaoi anime". He criticized the OVA's adaptation of the story, explaining that it was assumed all viewers would be already familiar with the tale through Shōsetsu June.

References

External links
 Official anime website 
 Entry in The Encyclopedia of Science Fiction''
 Kocha Sound's Ai No Kusabi website
 

1986 novels
1992 anime OVAs
2012 anime OVAs
Anime International Company
Digital Manga Publishing titles
Light novels
Media Blasters
Science fiction anime and manga
Science fiction novel series
Yaoi anime and manga